Donald John Hall (7 June 1937 – 23 April 2018) was an Australian rules footballer who played with Carlton in the Victorian Football League (VFL).

Notes

External links 

Don Hall's profile at Blueseum

1937 births
Carlton Football Club players
Australian rules footballers from Victoria (Australia)
2018 deaths